Ukrainka (until 1958, Khrushchevo (Хрущево)) is village in Beryslav Raion, Kherson Oblast, southern Ukraine, about  northeast from the centre of Kherson city. It belongs to Novooleksandrivka rural hromada, one of the hromadas of Ukraine.

History 
Until 18 July, 2020, Ukrainka belonged to Novovorontsovka Raion. The raion was abolished in July 2020 as part of the administrative reform of Ukraine, which reduced the number of raions of Kherson Oblast to five. The area of Novovorontsovka Raion was merged into Beryslav Raion.

The village came under attack by Russian forces in 2022, during the Russian invasion of Ukraine, and was regained by Ukrainian forces in the beginning of October.

Demographics
The settlement had 313 inhabitants in 2001. The native language distribution as of the Ukrainian Census of 2001 was:
Ukrainian: 92.97%
Russian: 3.83%
Moldovan (Romanian): 3.19%

References

Villages in Beryslav Raion